Lara Flynn Boyle (born March 24, 1970) is an American actress. She is best known for her role as Donna Hayward in the television series Twin Peaks (1990–1991). After portraying Stacy in Penelope Spheeris's comedy Wayne's World (1992), Boyle had a lead role in John Dahl's neo-noir film Red Rock West (1993), followed by roles in Threesome (1994), Cafe Society (1995), and Happiness (1998). From 1997 to 2003, Boyle portrayed Assistant District Attorney Helen Gamble in the ABC television series The Practice for which she was nominated for a Primetime Emmy Award Outstanding Supporting Actress in a Drama Series.

Early life
Boyle was born in Davenport, Iowa, the daughter of Sally Flynn, a clerical worker, assistant, and manager, and Michael L. Boyle. Her paternal grandfather was U.S. Representative Charles A. Boyle. She has Irish, German, and Italian ancestry. She is named after a character in Boris Pasternak's novel Doctor Zhivago. Her father left when she was six, causing her and her mother to move to smaller quarters. Around this time, she was diagnosed with dyslexia. She was raised in Chicago, Illinois, and Wisconsin, and graduated from The Chicago Academy for the Arts.

Career

1986–1991: Career beginnings and Twin Peaks
 In 1986, Boyle landed a small part in John Hughes's teen comedy film Ferris Bueller's Day Off, which earned her a SAG card, though her scenes were deleted from the final cut of the film. Subsequently, Boyle had a supporting role as Jackie Bradford in the television miniseries Amerika (1987), followed by guest appearances on episodes of the series Jack and Mike (1987) and Sable (1987).

After a string of supporting roles, Boyle landed a lead role in the Gary Sherman horror film Poltergeist III (1988), which was distributed by the media company MGM. Although she was cast as Ginny Danburry in Peter Weir's drama film Dead Poets Society (1989), her scenes were ultimately deleted from the final cut.

In 1989, Boyle rose to international prominence when David Lynch cast her as Donna Hayward in the television series Twin Peaks (1990–1991). The series focused on the murder of the high school Homecoming Queen Laura Palmer, with Boyle portraying Laura's best friend. Her main storyline focused on her trying to solve the mystery of who killed Laura.

The series premiered April 8, 1990, on ABC and subsequently became one of the top-rated series of 1990, but a decline in ratings ultimately led to its cancellation after its second season in 1991. Boyle appeared in all 30 episodes.

When discussing Lynch's direction, Boyle stated, "I remember, in the pilot, I did a very long scene that we had to shoot 30 or 40 times. David came up to me and said quietly, in my ear: 'Think of how gently a deer has to move in the snow…' It was strange direction. But that's what I thought of, and it worked. We were at the helm of a piece of heaven on Twin Peaks and we just went where David Lynch told us. That might sound very obscure but it really is true. How he sees the world is how we should all see the world."

In October 1990, while promoting Twin Peaks, Boyle was featured on the cover of Rolling Stone magazine along with her co-stars Mädchen Amick and Sherilyn Fenn. While starring on Twin Peaks, Boyle portrayed Sarah in Clint Eastwood's action film The Rookie (1990), Rosarita in Adam Rifkin's satirical comedy film The Dark Backward (1991), Mara Motes in Michael Karbelnikoff's crime film Mobsters (1991), and Sandra Gladstone in the romantic thriller Eye of the Storm (1991).

Boyle also appeared in the television films Terror on Highway 91 (1989), The Preppie Murder (1989), as well as episodes of The Hidden Room and May Wine.

1992–2003: Red Rock West and early success
Shortly after the cancellation of Twin Peaks, plans were being made for a feature film adaptation. Boyle was asked by Lynch to reprise her role as Donna Hayward in the psychological horror film Twin Peaks: Fire Walk with Me (1992) but she was unable to commit to the project due to scheduling conflicts with her roles as Heather in Marc Rocco's drama film Where the Day Takes You (alongside her Twin Peaks co-star Kyle MacLachlan), Stacy in Penelope Spheeris's comedy Wayne's World, and Beverly Franks in Alan Rudolph's crime drama Equinox. This led to her being replaced by actress Moira Kelly. In 1993, Boyle starred as Kris Bolin in the thriller film The Temp and portrayed the temptress Suzanne Brown in the neo-noir film Red Rock West alongside Nicolas Cage and Dennis Hopper.

In 1994, Boyle was cast as Alex in the comedy Threesome, Laraine Cotwell in Baby's Day Out, and Ida Muntz in The Road to Wellville. The same year, Boyle appeared in the television films Past Tense and Jacob. In 1995, she was cast as Pat Ward in the mystery film Cafe Society. In 1997, she portrayed Marianne Byron in the film Afterglow. Boyle auditioned for the title role in David E. Kelley's Ally McBeal. Although she lost out to Calista Flockhart, Boyle impressed Kelley enough to cast her the role of Assistant District Attorney Helen Gamble in his other 1997 series, The Practice. The following year, Boyle portrayed Helen Jordan in Todd Solondz’s controversial comedy-drama film Happiness.

She starred on The Practice until 2003, when, in a dramatic attempt to revamp the show and cut costs, she was dismissed along with most of the cast. For her performance as Helen Gamble, she received an Emmy nomination as well as several Screen Actors Guild ensemble cast nominations. Boyle also made a crossover appearance in the role of Helen Gamble in an episode of Ally McBeal, and an uncredited guest appearance on the same show in its final season.

In 2002, Boyle played a lead role in the blockbuster feature film Men in Black II, as the villainous shapeshifting alien Serleena. She also guest-starred on one of the last episodes of Ally McBeal, this time as Tally Cupp, and had a recurring role on several episodes of Huff.

2004–present: Return to television and independent films
In 2005, Boyle joined the cast of Las Vegas for a seven-episode stint as Monica Mancuso, a new hotel owner. She played Barbara Amiel in the television film Shades of Black, about Amiel and her husband, Lord Black. Boyle also guest-starred as an ambitious reporter involved with the suspects in a possible murder in the Law & Order 2008 episode "Submission".
In 2009, Boyle portrayed Mary in Baby on Board. The same year, Boyle was cast as Betty McBain in the independent film Life Is Hot in Cracktown. In 2010, she starred as Kathy in Cougar Hunting. In 2013, Boyle portrayed Witch Agnes in the horror comedy film Hansel & Gretel Get Baked. In 2015, she portrayed Ms. Donley in the film Lucky Dog.

In 2020, after a five-year break, she returned to acting to star as Grace in the film Death in Texas alongside Stephen Lang.

Personal life
Boyle was in a relationship with Twin Peaks co-star Kyle MacLachlan from 1990 to 1992. Boyle has been married twice. Her first husband was John Patrick Dee III, whom she married on August 11, 1996, and divorced two years later. Boyle dated actor David Spade, and later dated Jack Nicholson after he asked Boyle out in front of Spade while they were smoking marijuana. Spade later found out they were together after Nicholson and Boyle were involved in a car crash, covered by paparazzi. They went public with their romance at the 1999 Emmys, and reportedly remained together until the end of 2000. Her second and current husband is Donald Ray Thomas II, a real estate investor, whom she married on December 18, 2006, in San Antonio, Texas.

Filmography

Film

Television

References

External links

1970 births
20th-century American actresses
21st-century American actresses
Actresses from Chicago
Actresses from Iowa
Actresses from Wisconsin
American film actresses
American people of German descent
American people of Irish descent
American people of Italian descent
American television actresses
Living people
People from Davenport, Iowa
Actors with dyslexia